Iran has a large network of private, public, and state affiliated universities offering degrees in higher education. State-run universities of Iran are under the direct supervision of Iran's Ministry of Science, Research and Technology (for non-medical universities) and Ministry of Health and Medical Education (for medical schools). According to article 3 of the Constitution of the Islamic Republic of Iran, Iran guarantees "free education and physical training for everyone at all levels, and the facilitation and expansion of higher education." ...

History

Pre-Islamic era 

The existence of pre-Islamic era universities such as the School of Nisibis, Sarouyeh, Reishahr, and The Academy of Gundishapur provide examples of precedence of academic institutions of science that date back to ancient times.

Islamic era 

The traditions and heritage of these centers of higher learning were later carried on to schools such as Iran's Nizamiyya, and Baghdad's House of Wisdom, during the Islamic era.
Nizamiyyah institutes were among the first well organized institutions of higher learning in the Muslim world. The quality of education was among the highest in the Islamic world, and they were even renowned in Europe. They were supported financially, politically, and spiritually by the royal establishment and the elite class. Some scholars have suggested that the establishment of the Nizamiyya madrasas was in fact an attempt to thwart the growing influence of another group of Muslims, the Ismailis, in the region. Indeed, Nizam al-Mulk devoted a significant section in his famous Books of Politics (Siyāsatnāma) to refuting the Ismaili doctrines.

The most famous and celebrated of all the nizamiyyah schools was Al-Nizamiyya of Baghdad (established 1065), where Khwaja Nizam al-Mulk appointed the distinguished philosopher and theologian, al-Ghazali, as a professor.  Persian poet Sa'di was a student of the Baghdad Nizamiyyah.  Other nizamiyyah schools were located in Nishapur, Amol, Balkh, Herat and Isfahan.

Modern 
It was Abbas Mirza who first dispatched Iranian students to Europe for a western education.

The history of the establishment of western style academic universities in Iran (Persia) dates back to 1851 with the establishment of Darolfonoon – which was founded as a result of the efforts of the royal vizier Mirza Taghi Khan Amir Kabir, aimed at training and teaching Iranian experts in many fields of science and technology.

In 1855 "The Ministry of Science" was first established, and Ali Gholi Mirza I'tizad al-saltaneh (علیقلی میرزا اعتضاد السلطنه) was appointed Iran's first Minister of Science by Nasereddin Shah.

By the 1890s Darolfonoon was competing with other prominent institutions of modern learning. The Military College of Tehran (Madraseh-ye Nezam), established in 1885 with a budget of 10,000-12,000 tomans, was its first rival; and in 1899 the College of political sciences (Madraseh-ye olum-e siyasi) was organized within the Foreign ministry.

The Ministry of Higher Education, which oversees the operation of all institutes of higher education in Iran, was established in 1967. However, it was back in 1928 that Iran's first university, as we know it today, was proposed by an Iranian physicist, Mahmoud Hessaby. The University of Tehran (or Tehran University) was designed by French architect Andre Godard, and built in 1934. Today, Tehran University is Iran's largest university with over 32,000 students.

In the medical field, it was Joseph Cochran who first founded a professional school in Iran in 1878, and who is often credited for founding Iran's "first contemporary medical college", as well as founding one of Iran's first modern hospitals ("Westminster Hospital") in Urmia formerly known as Rezaieh in honor of Shia Islam's 8th Imam. The medical faculty Cochran established at Urmia University was joined by several other Americans, namely Drs. Wright, Homlz, van Nourdon, and Miller. They were all buried in Urmia as their resting place after serving the area for many years.

In Tehran, Samuel M. Jordan, whom "Jordan Ave." in Tehran is named after, also was directly responsible for the expansion of the American College in Tehran. The school received a permanent charter from the Board of Regents of the State University of New York in 1932.

By the end of the first Pahlavi period in 1941, the University of Tehran was still the only modern university in the country. Hence, the ministry of science commenced the establishment of other universities in Isfahan, Tabriz, Ahvaz, and Shiraz, with special emphasis given to the medical and veterinary sciences. Charles Oberling was highly instrumental in this regard.

In 1953, there were four universities with 14,500 undergraduate students whereas in 1977 there were 16 universities with 154,315 undergraduate students.

The Shah soon initiated projects to build Iranian universities modeled after American schools. Thus Pahlavi University (Shiraz University today), Sharif University of Technology, and Isfahan University of Technology, three of Iran's top academic universities were all directly modeled on American institutions such as the University of Illinois at Chicago, MIT, and the University of Pennsylvania. The Shah in return was generous in awarding American universities with financial gifts. For example, the University of Southern California received a gift from the Shah in the form of an endowed chair of petroleum engineering, and a million dollar donation was given to the George Washington University to create an Iranian Studies program.

The Iranian revolution put an end to the massive US-Iran academic relations. In 1980, a major overhaul in the academia and higher education system of Iran initiated by Ayatollah Khomeini led to what is referred to in Iran as "Iran's Cultural Revolution". However, all universities in the country were closed down from 1980 to 1983. In addition, Islamic curricula and Islamic educational setting were introduced when the universities were reopened.

In 1986, the ministry of higher education handed over supervision and overseeing of education in the medical sciences in Iran to the ministry of health, treatment and medical education. This was to optimize use of the medical resources in the country, and to promote health, treatment, teaching, and research more efficiently in the field.

After the Iran–Iraq War, some new universities were founded and doctoral programs were developed in the previous universities. The number of university students is now more than six times as many as in 1979 (when Shah was overthrown), so that critics debate whether the national entrance exam is useful anymore or not.

Academic system of Iranian universities 

In 2008, Iran had over 3.5 million students enrolled in universities.  Some 1.7 million in various programs in Islamic Azad university and the remainder in State universities.   In addition the new enrollment numbers for the academic year 2004 were 290 thousand in Azad universities, and 250 thousand in state universities. Iran has 54 state operated universities, and 42 state medical schools. These are primarily the top choice for students in national entrance exams, and have the largest and most prestigious programs. There are 289 major private universities operating as well. In all these schools, except for private universities such as the Islamic Azad University system, tuition and room and board is mostly paid for by the government. The universities themselves largely operate on state budgets. There are also institutes like Payame Noor University that offer degrees remotely or online.

Some schools offer degrees in conjunction with European universities. The International University of Chabahar for example offers programs under the guidance of London School of Economics and Political Science Goldsmiths University of London, and Royal Holloway. Other schools such as the Institute for Advanced Studies in Basic Sciences in Zanjan, have close collaboration with The International Centre for Theoretical Physics in Trieste, Italy for workshops, seminars, and summer schools. The Iranian government also offers intensely competitive but fully paid scholarships for successful applicants to pursue PhD-level studies in several foreign countries, mostly Great Britain.

By early 2000, Iran allocated around 0.4% of its GDP to R&D, which ranks it "far behind industrialized societies" and the world average of 1.4%. By 2009 this ratio of research to GDP reached 0.87% and the set target is 2.5%.

Rankings 

Five Iranian universities have been placed among the world’s top 1,000 universities announced by the Quacquarelli Symonds (QS) World University Rankings 2021. U.S. News & World Report published a global ranking for universities and institutes of higher education in 2018. The best global universities in Iran were ranked as follows:

Ranking by number of publications (ISI) 

As per the data published on QS World University Rankings official website, Sharif University of Technology, ranked 432, Amirkabir University of Technology, ranked 498, Iran University of Science and Technology, ranked between 601 and 651, University of Tehran, ranked between 701 and 750, Shahid Beheshti University, ranked between 800 and 1000, and Shiraz University, ranked between 800 and 1000, are the top 6 Iranian universities among world-class universities.

The Times Higher Education Young University Rankings website has listed the world's best universities that are aged 50 years or under in 2018. Three Iranian universities are included in the recent Times Higher Education Young University Rankings.
Babol Noshirvani University of Technology, ranked 55, Isfahan University of Technology, ranked between 101 and 150, and University of Gilan ranked between 201 and 250, are among the young top universities worldwide.

Medical schools 
ISC's most recent list of the highest-ranked universities in the medical field for 2012 is:

Tehran University of Medical Sciences
Shiraz University of Medical Sciences
Shahid Beheshti University of Medical Sciences (Former Melli University)
Isfahan University of Medical Sciences
Tabriz University of Medical Sciences
Mashad University of Medical Sciences
Ahvaz Jundishapur University of Medical Sciences

Dental schools 
According to the 2007 rankings the top five rated schools in the dental field in Iran are:
Shahid Beheshti University of Medical Sciences
Tehran University of Medical Sciences and Mashad University of Medical Sciences
Isfahan University of Medical Sciences
Kerman University of Medical Sciences and Shahid Sadoughi University of Medical Sciences and Health Services and Hamedan University of Medical Sciences
Ahvaz Jundishapur University of Medical Sciences and Shiraz University of Medical Sciences and Babol University of Medical Sciences

Pharmacy schools 
According to the 2010 rankings the top three rated schools in the pharmaceutical field in Iran are:
Tehran University of Medical Sciences
Isfahan University of Medical Sciences
Tabriz University of Medical Sciences

Engineering schools 
According to the 2019 U.S.News university ranking  the top-ranked engineering schools in the engineering field and their rank among world universities are:
Islamic Azad University 31
University of Tehran 39
Sharif University of Technology 92
Amirkabir University of Technology 106
Iran University of Science and Technology 145
University of Tabriz 192
Isfahan University of Technology 202
Tarbiat Modares University 207
Ferdowsi University of Mashhad 228
Babol Noshirvani University of Technology 231
Technical and Vocational University 250_300

Prominent libraries in Iran 
Large libraries existed in Iran both before and after the advent of Islam and throughout many periods in Iran's history, including the libraries at Gondeshapur, School of Nisibis, and Sarouyeh during the pre-Islamic era of Iran.

During the Middle Ages, many schools of Nizamiyya harbored large collections of manuscripts and treatises. In Maragheh, Nasīr al-Dīn al-Tūsī built a library that reportedly contained some 40,000 volumes which was well financed and the royal library of the Samanid court in which Avicenna was granted special access to, is yet another fine example.

The first prototype of a modern national library in Iran was the Library of Dar al-Funun College established in 1851. In 1899 another library called the Nation's Library was inaugurated in Tehran. Finally, the National Library of Iran was inaugurated in 1937.

Iran's major national libraries today are:
 National Library of Iran, Tehran
 Central Library of Astan Quds Razavi, Mashad
 Tabriz National Library, Tabriz
 Malek National Library, Tehran
 Ayatollah Marashi Najafi Library, Qom
 Iran's Library of The Parliament
 Shiraz Regional Library of Science and Technology, Shiraz
 Library of Institute for Studies in Theoretical Physics and Mathematics

Ideology and politics in higher education 

Under the rule of the Islamic theocracy in Iran since 1979 revolution, the status of science and education has been dramatically affected in the country. In particular, following the so-called Iranian Cultural Revolution and Islamization of universities after a shutdown period, the quality of science and technology has since been revived, so much so that Iran ranked 40th in science production and first in scientific growth in the world in 2011.

Exclusion of students

Religious 

Students of unrecognized minority religions have been barred from entering tertiary education institutions in Iran, particularly those of the Baháʼí Faith. Since the Iranian Revolution of 1979 Baháʼí students have been excluded from universities regardless of their national university examination results on basis of their religion. See Baháʼí Institute for Higher Education.

Gender-based 

Additionally, in August 2012, 36 universities declared that 77 BA and BSc courses in 2012–2012 academic year would be "single gender" and effectively exclusive to men, limiting the options of female undergraduate students.

Entrepreneurship 

In accordance with the third five-year development plan, the “entrepreneurship development plan in Iranian universities”, (known as KARAD Plan) was developed, and launched in twelve universities across the country, under the supervision of Management and Planning Organization and the Ministry of Science, Research and Technology.

Brain drain and students abroad 

Iran tops the world countries in the brain drain phenomenon. In 2002, the CIA estimated that 77% of Iran's population aged 15 and over can read and write. By 2008, the adult literacy rate had reached 80.6%. A significant majority of this population is at or approaching collegiate levels. Of this population, nearly 150,000 are estimated to exit Iran every year.

According to the Iranian government, in 2013, 12,000 foreign students were studying at Iranian universities while 55,686 Iranian students were studying abroad. Out of this number, 8,883 students were studying in Malaysia, 7,341 in the United States, 5,638 in Canada, 3,504 in Germany, 3,364 in Turkey, 3,228 in Britain, and the rest in other countries. But according to a newer estimate by the Minister of education, between 350 and 500 thousand Iranians were studying outside of the country in 2014. The difference remains unexplained. As of 2015, 42% of recent/young graduates were unemployed. As of 2020, 40,000 foreign nationals are studying in 43 Iranian universities, 22,000 of whom are studying at the universities affiliated to the Ministry of Science, 8,000 at the Azad University, 3,000 at the Ministry of Health, and the rest at other universities. Some 50 percent of these students are studying for a bachelor's degree and 16 percent of whom are educating to receive a Ph.D.

See also 

 Education in Iran
 Science and technology in Iran
 Economy of Iran
School of Economic Affairs (Iran)
 Venture capital in Iran
 International Rankings of Iran in Education
 List of Iranian Research Centers
 List of Iranian scientists
 Modern Iranian scientists and engineers
 List of universities in Iran
 List of Universities in Tehran Province
 List of colleges and universities in Tehran
 Iranian Studies
 Intellectual Movements in Iran

Historic institutions
 Darolfonoon
 Academy of Gundishapur
 Nizamiyyah
 Imperial Iranian Academy of Philosophy

References

External links 
Official
 Ministry of Health and Medical Education – Research Branch
 Islamic Republic of Iran Academy of Sciences
 Islamic Republic of Iran International Center for Dialogue Among Civilizations
 Tehran Education Organization (Amuzesh Parvaresh)
 Islamic Republic of Iran Academy of Persian Language and Literature
 Islamic Republic of Iran Academy of Medical Sciences
 Islamic Republic of Iran Cultural Heritage Organization
 Iran Scientific Information and Documentation Center
 Iran's Presidential Office of Scientific and Industrial Studies
 Iranian Nano-Technology Initiative
 Allameh Tabatabaee University

Other
 Education IRAN
 Iranian Diaspora: "Smart Bunch"
 The Guardian: Iranian hawk swoops on universities to crush dissent
 One example of electronic education (e-learning) in Iran: Biotechnology e-workshops

Education in Iran
Iran
Science and technology in Iran
Higher education in Iran